Diogo Botelho Pereira was a 16th-century Portuguese nobleman, colonial official, navigator and cartographer. He famously undertook a daring voyage by sea from India back to Portugal aboard a fusta.

Born in Portuguese India, Botelho was the son of Iria Pereira and António Real, captain of Fort Emmanuel of Cochin. In India, Botelho learned to navigate and compiled detailed portolan charts for the Portuguese navy, in the service of which he commanded ships of the Portuguese India Armadas and participated in military expeditions.

Coming to Lisbon, King John III granted him an official title of fidalgo, but Pereira fell out of royal favour over disagreements with the monarch regarding his proper compensation for services to the Crown, and was instead banished to India in perpetuity. This motivated his audacious enterprise of sailing a minuscule vessel from India back to Portugal, between November 1535 and May 1536, bearing the first news of the construction of the Portuguese fortress of Diu, to prove his worth and loyalty. King John awarded him with the post of captain of São Tomé, between 1541 and 1545, but his vessel was destroyed, to prevent rival European nations from presupposing that the voyage to the East might be easily undertaken, and Portugal's monopoly challenged.

Pereira continued serving in the royal Portuguese navy afterwards, sailing ships linking Lisbon and Goa; in 1549 he commanded a fleet of five carracks bound to India, and returned in 1551. Later in his life he was attributed the post of captain of the Portuguese fortress of Canannore in India.

See also
 List of governors of Portuguese São Tomé and Príncipe

References 

 João de Barros: Da Asia de João de Barros e de Diogo de Couto, Volume 12, Decade V, Book I chapter II 1779 edition.
 Ignacio da Costa Quintella: Annaes da marinha portugueza, Volume 1, 1839, p. 441
 Carta de Diogo Botelho Pereira dando conta ao Barão de Alvito D. Rodrigo Lobo, dos Sucessos que teve na viagem da Índia e estado dela. Que o Turco tomara Adém, no Estreito de Meca, e, no de Ormuz, Baçorá e Catifa (Al-Qatif). Que o rei de Cambaia preparava grande armada e o de Calecut não queria guerra.- Letter from Diogo Botelho Pereira to the Baron of Alvito, regarding the state of affairs in India, preserved in the Torre do Tombo Arquives in Lisbon.

16th-century Portuguese people
Portuguese explorers
Portuguese navigators
Governors of Portuguese São Tomé and Príncipe
Year of birth missing
Year of death missing